Vasundhara Raje was sworn-in as Chief Minister of Rajasthan state in India on 8 December 2003. She was elected as the leader of BJP in Rajasthan Legislative Assembly. She remained chief minister until 11 December 2008. Here is the list of ministers:

Chief Minister & Cabinet Ministers

Ministers of State with independent charge

Ministers of State

See also
Vasundhara Raje ministry (2013–)

References

2003 in Indian politics
Raje 01
Bharatiya Janata Party state ministries
2003 establishments in Rajasthan
2008 disestablishments in India
Cabinets established in 2003
Cabinets disestablished in 2008